Hate is an emotion of intense revulsion.

Hate may also refer to:

Film and television
Hate (film), a 1920 German silent film
Hate (1995 film) or La Haine, a French film 
"Hate" (Law & Order), a television episode
Hate* (*a comedy), a 1999 short thriller comedy movie

Literature
Hate (comics), a comic book by Peter Bagge
"Hate" (short story), a 1961 short story by Arthur C. Clarke
H.A.T.E., a group in Marvel comics

Music
 Hate (band), a Polish death metal band

Albums
 Hate (Bassi Maestro album) or the title song, 2005
 Hate (The Delgados album), 2002
 Hate (Sarcófago album) or the title song, 1994
 Hate (Thy Art Is Murder album), 2012
 Hate (EP), by Hawthorne Heights, or the title song, 2011
 Hate, by Sinister, 1995

Songs
 "Hate (I Really Don't Like You)", by the Plain White T's, 2006
 "Hate", by 4Minute from Act. 7, 2016
 "Hate", by Cat Power from The Greatest, 2006
 "Hate", by Get Scared from Best Kind of Mess, 2011
 "Hate", by Jay-Z from The Blueprint 3, 2009
 "Hate", by Kiss from Carnival of Souls: The Final Sessions, 1997
 "Hate?", by Band-Maid from Unleash, 2022

Video games
Hate (video gaming), a mechanism in some MMORPGs and RPGs
H.A.T.E.: Hostile All-Terrain Encounter, a 1989 video game

See also
 Hate crime
 Hate Me (disambiguation)
 Hated (disambiguation)
 Hater (disambiguation)
 Hatred (disambiguation)